Rear Admiral Oral Raymond Swigart (October 7, 1897June 21, 1973) was an American naval officer.  While at the United States Naval Academy he competed in the Greco-Roman lightweight event at the 1920 Summer Olympics.  During World War II Swigart served as commander of the USS Melville, escorting some of the first troops to Britain in early 1942.  He later served in command of a flotilla of Landing Ship, Tanks in the Pacific Theatre.  Swigart received two Legions of Merit and the Bronze Star for his service.

Early life 
Oral Raymond Swigart was born in Columbia City, Indiana, on October 9, 1897.  He attended Columbia City High School before entering the United States Naval Academy in Annapolis, Maryland.  Swigart captained the naval academy's wrestling team and was entered onto the Naval Academy Athletic Association hall of fame.  He was part of the American team sent to the 1920 Summer Olympics where he competed in the Greco-Roman lightweight event.  Swigart was granted permission to remain at the academy longer than normal to train for the event.  He beat the Italian Walter Ranghieri in the first round but was knocked out by Frits Janssens in round two.  Janssens was of heavier weight and more familiar with the Greco-Roman style; Swigart was used to freestyle wrestling.

Naval career 
After graduating from the academy in 1921 Swigart was commissioned into the US Navy.  He was commander of the USS Melville which accompanied the first American troops to the United Kingdom in January 1942.  Swigart was recognized for his efforts when commanding troop transports during the Allied invasion of Sicily.  

Transferring to the Pacific Theatre he commanded Landing Ship, Tank Flotilla 8.  Swigart landed troops and supplies at Tonga and New Zealand and helped transport the First Marine Division to the Solomon Islands.  He later participated in the Guadalcanal campaign, landing supplies for the troops and brought troops to the beaches of Leyte and Manila.  This included the Invasion of Lingayen Gulf and the Battle of Mindanao.  Swigart received the Legion of Merit with a star for a second award and combat "V" device and a Bronze Star for his service.  He was also awarded the European–African–Middle Eastern Campaign Medal with one campaign star, the Asiatic–Pacific Campaign Medal with five campaign stars and the Philippine Liberation Medal with two campaign stars. He retired in 1951 as a rear admiral.

Personal life 
Swigart was married to Margaret Williams.  They had two sons who both served as officers in the United States Marine Corps: Oral Swigart Jr. who reached the rank of colonel and Captain Robert Williams Swigart who was killed in action in the Vietnam War in July 1967.  Oral Swigart Sr. died in Paris, France, on June 21, 1973, of a suspected heart attack.

References

1897 births
1973 deaths
Olympic wrestlers of the United States
Wrestlers at the 1920 Summer Olympics
American male sport wrestlers
People from Columbia City, Indiana
Sportspeople from Indiana
Military personnel from Indiana
United States Navy rear admirals
Navy Midshipmen wrestlers
United States Navy personnel of World War II
Recipients of the Legion of Merit